Summer Songs 2 is the second commercial mixtape by American rapper Lil Yachty. It was released on July 20, 2016, exclusively on Apple Music, with other streaming services following the release. The mixtape features guest appearances from TheGoodPerry, G Herbo, JBan$2Turnt, Byou, Big Brutha Chubba, Offset, Tyler Royale, K$upreme and Cook Laflare, among others. The production from the mixtape was handled by TheGoodPerry, Wizard Beatz, D33J, Misogi, ILoveUPeter, Chris Fresh, Khalil Byous, Earl, 1Mind, Sage and Free School.

Critical reception

Writing for Exclaim!, Chris Dart called it a "mix of likeability and being at the right place at the right time", and praised the production, which he stated "runs the gamut from chillwave to experimental keyboard soundscapes to something best described as what would happen you force fed trap music through an '80s soft rock band." Pitchfork wrote that "Yachty is delivering an aesthetic, which is catnip to some (mostly those 25 and under) and repellent to others. But if you're locked in, Summer Songs 2 can be a lot of fun." 

Tiny Mix Tapes highlighted the mixtape in their monthly roundup, describing it as "another mega ray of light to a chorus of auto-tuned cheers and boat ad-libs", describing the songs as "fresh air in a stiff room, and damn if this world doesn't need more of it".

Track listing

Charts

References 

2016 mixtape albums
Albums produced by D33J
Hip hop albums by American artists
Lil Yachty albums
Southern hip hop albums
Sequel albums
Quality Control Music albums